Eso-Charis, originally called Elliot, was a Christian alternative rock band with hardcore and metalcore influences that formed in Fort Smith, Arkansas. Founding members, brothers Cory Brandan Putman and Matthew Putman, and Arthur Green, eventually went on to join the band Living Sacrifice. In late 1997, the band recorded their first and only full-length album with Bruce Fitzhugh of Living Sacrifice. The album was first produced independently, but was after leased to Day-Glo Records of Stockholm, Sweden. Later on, production of the album moved to Solid State Records, the same label as Living Sacrifice. Cory has stated that they most likely will not do a reunion. He also stated that after his brother and Green quit the band they added two guitarists, bassists, and drummers, with Cory and Jayson being the vocalists.

Members 
Final line-up

Brandan stated in an interview the final lineup consisted of eight people, with two guitarists, two bassists, two drummers and Brandan and Holmes on vocals.

Timeline

Discography 

 The Plateau Green (Independent, 1997)
 Eso-Charis (Solid State Records, 1998)
 Setting Roots for the Winter (7-inch record) (Deadself Records, 2000)

References

External links 

 
 Interview at Art for the Ears
 
 

Heavy metal musical groups from Arkansas
Musical quintets
Musical groups established in 1995
American Christian metal musical groups
Solid State Records artists
Metalcore musical groups from Arkansas